The PL/P programming language (an acronym of Programming Language for Prime (computers)) is a mid-level programming language developed by Prime Computer to serve as their second primary system programming language after Fortran IV.  PL/P was a subset of PL/I.

Additions to the PRIMOS operating system for Prime 50 Series computers were written mostly in PL/P in later years.  Certain PRIMOS modules written in Fortran IV during PRIMOS's early years were rewritten in PL/P.  PL/P was the most widespread compiled programming language used for commercial PRIMOS applications, outpacing the use of the Prime C compiler, the CPL (PRIMOS) scripting language, and the Fortran IV compiler in commercial applications.

References

Systems programming languages
PL/I programming language family